Boans was a department store chain that operated in Perth, Western Australia between from the late 19th century to the late 20th century. 

It was located between Wellington Street and Murray Street and had the Padbury Buildings between it and Forrest Place.

The store was founded by Harry Boan and his brother Benjamin who both came to Perth in 1895 from Broken Hill in western New South Wales.  Harry and another brother, Ernest, had previously established a successful drapery known as "Boan Bros. Ltd." in that town.

City store
The brothers arrived in Perth in mid-1895 when Harry was 34, and purchased two  blocks facing Wellington Street and the Perth railway station, at the edge of a potato swamp.  The properties ("V.7-8") were purchased from  Woods & Co, at a price of £42 per foot of street frontage.  They borrowed £62,000 and within four months, despite acute labour shortages, had built, stocked and opened a single-storey emporium on the site and named it "Boan Bros."  The store opened on 7 November 1895, and almost sold out by the end of the first day of trading.  The original buildings were described as a single store that ran from Wellington Street through to Murray Street and appeared as  "a line of iron shops".

In 1901, Benjamin died and Harry assumed sole ownership.  Harry purchased adjoining land that spanned the block between Wellington and Murray Streets, near Forrest Place.  The business was restructured to become a limited company in 1912 and the name was changed to Boans Ltd.  In the same year, the original buildings were demolished and rebuilt as a single building between Murray and Wellington Streets. 

Over time, the store became the largest private employer in Western Australia.

In late 1929 Harry Boan handed control of the Boans store to his son Frank Boan who had been living in England with his mother since 1913.

Like similar businesses, Boans had a mail order catalogue issued from the late 1930s that continued into the 1950s.

The Boans department store in Wellington Street Perth was subject to a major fire in 1979, which closed the store for some weeks. The store reopened, prior to its closure in 1986 when it was sold to Coles Myer Ltd to make way for the new Forrest Chase Myer complex. This was later considered a bizarre coincidence, as the Boans department store in Morley was destroyed by fire in 1986. The Morley complex was later rebuilt, housing a Myer department store.

East Perth furniture factory
In about 1910 Boans opened a furniture factory in East Perth to service the shop.  It produced bedroom furniture, including mattresses, dining and kitchen furniture. There was also a cane-ware and upholstery section.  Imported furniture was also held there.

After World War II, the factory would also house a bakery and butchery, where smallgoods were manufactured.  Between 30 and 40 vehicles operated out of the receivals and despatch section, which also included garaging and mechanical services.

After the Perth store closed, the building fell into disrepair for some years, but in 1996 was assessed by the Heritage Council of Western Australia as having historic, aesthetic and social value.  As part of the redevelopment of the area by the East Perth Redevelopment Authority, the buildings have now been transformed into upmarket housing and office accommodation.

The site is bounded by Brown, Glyde and Saunders Streets and the building retains the name of Boans painted on its exterior.

Suburban stores

During the latter part of the twentieth century, the company expanded by opening a number of suburban stores, as part of the growing trend of decentralised "shopping centres" out of the city centre.

These included:  
Waverley in Cannington. The first suburban branch.
Morley.  Opened 1961, destroyed by a fire in 1986. The site has since been redeveloped as Centro Galleria.
Innaloo.
Garden City in Booragoon.
Peppermint Grove. This store site was later acquired by Harris Scarfe in 1996 and was the foundation Harris Scarfe department store in Western Australia. The store continued trading as a Harris Scarfe store until 2001.
Melville Plaza in Canning Highway.
Medina Shopping Centre, then Kwinana Hub.
Karrinyup. A Myer store upon opening. Traded as Boans for two years (1986–1988). Relabelled Myer in 1988.
Fremantle. The Myer store was rebadged as Boans for two years between 1986–1988. Myer had bought out Boans and had intended on using the Boans rather than Myer name on its Western Australia stores. Myer closed this store on 20 January 2013.

Country stores
Boans operated department stores in regional areas. When Myer acquired Boans, these stores were sold.

The stores were located at:

 Albany
 Bunbury
 Geraldton

Closure
Myer Emporium (now Coles Group) purchased the business in 1985 and the Boans city store closed its doors for the last time on 12 April 1986 so that a redevelopment into a larger department store could take place. The development became known as Forrest Chase with Myer as the anchor retailer.

Ross's Sales & Auctions held an on-site sale that cleared the entire building, including many fixtures and fittings such as the jarrah staircases and a Beale baby grand piano "in-situ on the fourth floor".  These items are now occasionally seen in refurbished and new buildings around Perth.

Myer said in 1986 that they would retain the Boans name and promptly rebadged the Myer city store at Murray Street and William Street (to be used as the city base until Forrest Chase was ready) and any Myer suburban stores with the Boans name. However, Myer management changed their mind in 1988 when the Forrest Chase building was nearing completion so that they could centralise all advertising and eliminate cost duplication. The Boans name was phased out over several weeks.

In 1989, Myer opened on the former Boans site with a new and larger store carrying through to Forrest Place.  The suburban stores were converted to "Myer" badging.

Boans country stores
Myer sold the country stores in Albany, Bunbury and Geraldton to Geoffrey Bingemann, who was a director of Boans prior to the Myer acquisition of the Boans business.

Bingemann rebadged these stores as Stirlings department stores, and he operated this business as a regional chain until 1996, when Harris Scarfe acquired the business and they became Harris Scarfe stores. Harris Scarfe continued trading until 2001.

See also
John Martin & Co.

References

Further reading
 Hough, David: Boans for Service. The Story of a department store 1895-1986. Claremont, Estate of F.T. Boan, 2009. .

History of Western Australia
Retail companies established in 1895
Defunct department stores of Australia
Retail companies disestablished in 1986
Australian companies established in 1895
1986 disestablishments in Australia
Australian companies disestablished in 1986
Wellington Street, Perth
Companies based in Perth, Western Australia